Prekopčelica is a village in the municipality of Lebane, Serbia. According to the 2002 census, the village has a population of 508 people.
In the Ottoman period it was a local center with around 2000 inhabitants, before the neighbouring village of Lebane gained in importance due to textile industry .
Close to the village is the archaeological site of  Caričin grad (Iustiniana Prima), a town founded in the 6th c.

References

Populated places in Jablanica District